West Park is a   Local Nature Reserve on the western outskirts of Uckfield in East Sussex. It is owned and managed by Uckfield Town Council.

This site has grassland, woodland and a marshy area which provides a habitat for several orchid species, including the southern marsh orchid. There is also a population of dormice.

Access points include Princes Close.

References

Local Nature Reserves in East Sussex
Uckfield